James Noxon Lapum (July 1819 – July 26, 1879) was a Canadian politician.

Born in Erneston, Upper Canada (now Ontario), the son of Robert Lapum, he was a merchant and served as postmaster for Centreville for 20 years. In 1844, Lapum married Martha Fisk. He served as reeve for Camden Township for 7 years. Lapum opened a cheese factory in partnership with John Stewart Miller in 1870.

In 1867, he was elected to the 1st Canadian Parliament for the riding of Addington. A Conservative, he was defeated in 1872.

References

1819 births
1879 deaths
Conservative Party of Canada (1867–1942) MPs
Members of the House of Commons of Canada from Ontario
Canadian postmasters